The Heritable Jurisdictions (Scotland) Act 1746 (20 Geo. II c. 43) was an Act of Parliament passed in the aftermath of the Jacobite rising of 1745 abolishing judicial rights held by Scots heritors. These were a significant source of power, especially for clan chiefs since it gave them a large measure of control over their tenants.

The position of Sheriff-principal originated in the 13th century and still exists in modern Scotland. Originally appointed by the Crown, over the centuries the majority had become hereditary, the holders appointing legal professionals known as Sheriff-deputes to do the work. The Act returned control of these to the Crown.

Since Article XX of the 1707 Acts of Union recognised these rights as property, compensation was paid to the deprived heritors.

Purpose

The long title of the Act, which sets out the scheme and intention, is:

An Act for taking away and abolishing the Heretable Jurisdictions in Scotland; and for making Satisfaction to the Proprietors thereof; and for restoring such Jurisdictions to the Crown; and for making more effectual Provision for the Administration of Justice throughout that Part of the United Kingdom, by the King’s Courts and Judges there; ... and for rendering the Union of the Two Kingdoms more complete.

For remedying the inconveniences that have arisen and may arise from the multiplicity and extent of heretable jurisdictions in Scotland, for making satisfaction to the proprietors thereof, for restoring to the crown the powers of jurisdiction originally and properly belonging thereto, according to the constitution, and for extending the influence, benefit, and protection of the King’s laws and courts of justice to all his Majesty’s subjects in Scotland, and for rendering the union more complete.

History

The Act was one of a number of measures taken after the defeat of the 1745 Jacobite Rising to weaken the traditional rights held by clan chiefs, the others being the 1746 Dress Act and the Act of Proscription.

Such rights were not restricted to clan chiefs and were widespread throughout Scotland. There had been a number of previous attempts to either eliminate or weaken them; for example, the 1692 Church of Scotland Settlement removed the right of heritors to nominate church ministers for their own parishes.

Many remained, one of the most significant being control of the thirty-three Sheriffs who presided over the Scottish court system. In 1745, only eight of these were appointed by the Crown, three were appointed for life, with the rest being hereditary; their owners employed legal professionals known as Sheriff-substitutes or deputes, who earned their salary by taking a percentage of the fines imposed.   

The Act gave the Crown control over the appointment of Sheriffs, with the role of Justiciar transferred to the High Court of Justiciary. Since these were recognised as private property under Article XX of the 1707 Act of Union, their owners were compensated, although Jacobites were excluded.

A total of £152,000 was paid out in compensation, the two biggest payments being £38,000 to the Duke of Hamilton and £25,000 to the Duke of Argyll. Other recipients included Sir Andrew Agnew, hereditary sheriff of Wigtownshire, who received £4,000 in recognition of his support for the government in 1745.

In speaking for the Bill, Lord Hardwicke argued Crown control over such rights was essential; since 'the people will follow those who have the power to protect or hurt them;' it was therefore imperative for ministers of a constitutional monarch to remove such powers from private ownership. In response, Argyll quoted Montesquieu in support of his argument that multiple jurisdictions were a check on the Crown and thus a defence of liberty.

Since Argyll was one of the main beneficiaries, his intervention was simply to enable Hardwicke to highlight the House of Stuart's outdated belief in the divine right of kings and unquestioning obedience. He did so by agreeing such safeguards were required for states ruled by an absolute monarch but 'fortunately, Britain was not in that position.' This was because the constitution limited the powers of the Crown and ensured liberty; on the other hand, private jurisdictions endangered it by encroaching on the legal authority of a constitutional monarchy.

George II, in a speech also written by Hardwicke, praised the Act as measures for "better securing the liberties of the people there". The Prime Minister Henry Pelham considered it the most important measure in dealing with Jacobitism in Scotland. Most of its provisions have since been repealed, but it still specifies that any noble title created in Scotland after 6 June 1747 may grant no rights beyond those of landlordship (collecting rents).

The last remnants of feudal tenure in Scotland were ended by the Abolition of Feudal Tenure etc. (Scotland) Act 2000 which came into force on 28 November 2004.

See also
 Attainder
 Act of Proscription 1746
 Disarming Act 1716
 Dress Act 1746

Notes

Bibliography
 Browning, Reed, ‘Lord Hardwicke, the Court Whig as Legist’, Political and Constitutional Ideas of the Court Whigs (Louisiana State University Press, 1982)

Great Britain Acts of Parliament 1746
Jacobite rising of 1745
1746 in Scotland
Acts of the Parliament of Great Britain concerning Scotland
Judiciary of Scotland
Scottish clan chiefs